John Barr (1885 – after 1906) was a Scottish professional footballer who played as a winger.

References

1885 births
Sportspeople from Lanark
Scottish footballers
Association football wingers
Motherwell F.C. players
Lanemark F.C. players
Partick Thistle F.C. players
Grimsby Town F.C. players
English Football League players
Year of death missing
Footballers from South Lanarkshire